The Bishop of Argyll and the Isles refers to either of two bishops, each with a diocese overlapping the other's and belonging to a different church organization:

Roman Catholic Bishop of Argyll and the Isles
Bishop of Argyll and The Isles (Episcopal)

See also
Bishop of Argyll
Bishop of the Isles
Diocese of Argyll and the Isles (disambiguation)